Fauna of Liechtenstein may refer to:

 List of birds of Liechtenstein
 List of mammals of Liechtenstein

See also
 Outline of Liechtenstein